Ernst Krenkel Observatory, also known as Kheysa, was a former Soviet rocket launching site located on Heiss Island, Franz Josef Land. It is named after a famous Arctic explorer Ernst Krenkel, a member of the crew of the North Pole-1 drift ice station and other notable Soviet polar expeditions.

It served the MR-12 from 1956 to 1980 for the start of research in rocketry.

Climate

References

External links
 ISLANDS Website

Rocket launch sites in Russia
Franz Josef Land
Buildings and structures in Arkhangelsk Oblast
Soviet and Russian space program locations